The  (lit. ) or  ("Eighty-Thousand Tripiṭaka") is a Korean collection of the  (Buddhist scriptures, and the Sanskrit word for "three baskets"), carved onto 81,258 wooden printing blocks in the 13th century.

It is the oldest intact version of Buddhist canon in Hanja script, with 52,330,152 characters which are organized in over 1496 titles and 6568 volumes. Each wood block measures 24 centimetres in height and 70 centimetres in length. The woodblocks are in pristine condition without warping or deformation despite being created more than 750 years ago. The Tripiṭaka Koreana is stored in Haeinsa, a Buddhist temple in South Gyeongsang Province, in South Korea.

There is a movement by scholars to change the English name of the Tripiṭaka Koreana. Professor Robert Buswell Jr., a leading scholar of Korean Buddhism, called for the renaming of the Tripiṭaka Koreana to the Korean Buddhist Canon, indicating that the current nomenclature is misleading because the Tripiṭaka Koreana is much greater in scale than the actual Tripiṭaka, and includes much additional content such as travelogues, Sanskrit and Chinese dictionaries, and biographies of monks and nuns.

The Tripiṭaka was designated a National Treasure of South Korea in 1962, and inscribed in the UNESCO Memory of the World Register in 2007.

History

The name Goryeo Tripiṭaka comes from "Goryeo", the name of Korea from the 10th to the 14th centuries.

Work on the first Tripiṭaka Koreana began in 1011 during the Goryeo–Khitan War and was completed in 1087. Choi's Goryeo Military Regime, which moved the capital to Ganghwa Island due to Mongol invasions, set up a temporary organization called "Daejang Dogam". 

The act of carving the woodblocks was considered to be a way of bringing about a change in fortune by invoking the Buddha's help. The first Tripiṭaka Koreana was based primarily on the Northern Song Tripiṭaka completed in the 10th century, but other scriptures published until then, such as the Khitan Tripiṭaka, were also consulted in order to identify items in need of revision and adjustment. The first Tripiṭaka Koreana contained around 6,000 volumes.

The original set of woodblocks was destroyed by fire during the Mongol invasions of Korea in 1232, when Goryeo's capital was moved to Ganghwa Island during nearly three decades of Mongol incursions, although scattered parts of its prints still remain. To once again implore divine assistance with combating the Mongol threat, King Gojong thereafter ordered the revision and re-creation of the Tripiṭaka; the carving began in 1237 and was completed in 12 years, with support from Choe U and his son Choe Hang, and involving monks from both the Seon and Gyo schools. This second version is usually what is meant by the Tripiṭaka Koreana. In 1398, it was moved to Haeinsa, where it has remained housed in four buildings.

The production of the Tripiṭaka Koreana was an enormous national commitment of money and manpower, according to Robert Buswell Jr., perhaps comparable to the US 1960s Apollo program moon landings. Thousands of scholars and craftsmen were employed in this massive project.

Evaluation
The Tripiṭaka Koreana is the 32nd National Treasure of South Korea, and Haeinsa, the depository for the Tripiṭaka Koreana, has been designated as a UNESCO World Heritage Site. The UNESCO committee describes the Tripiṭaka Koreana as "one of the most important and most complete corpus of Buddhist doctrinal texts in the world". Not only is the work invaluable, it is also aesthetically valuable and shows a high quality of workmanship. Currently, the Palman Daejanggyeong is one of the three woodblocks in the world that are registered on UNESCO.

Haeinsa, the temple in which the Tripiṭaka Koreana is stored, While most of the wood blocks have remained in pristine condition for more than 750 years a few were damaged when a new depository was built in the early 1970s (by the Park Chung-hee regime) and a few blocks were transplanted to the new building on a trial basis. Those blocks were damaged almost immediately. They were subsequently moved back to their initial spots and the new building was shut down. That building is now the 'Zen Center'. Currently there are ongoing debates as to the quality of the current storage area.

The historical value of the Tripiṭaka Koreana comes from the fact that it is the most complete and accurate extant collection of Buddhist treatises, laws, and scriptures. While it is a popular misconception that the Tripitaka Koreana does not contain a single error; a survey found that the text does indeed have missing characters and errors. The compilers of the Korean version incorporated older Northern Song Chinese, Khitan, and Goryeo versions, and added content written by respected Korean monks. Scholars can get an idea of the older Chinese and Khitan versions of the Tripiṭaka from the Korean version today. The quality of the wood blocks is attributed to the National Preceptor Sugi, the Buddhist monk in charge of the project, who carefully checked the Korean version for errors. Upon completing the Tripiṭaka Koreana, Sugi published 30 volumes of Additional Records which recorded errors, redundancies, and omissions he found during his comparisons of the different versions of the Tripiṭaka. Because of the relative completion of the Korea edition of the Chinese Buddhist Tripitaka, the Japanese Taisho edition of the Tripiṭaka was said also to have been based on the Korean edition. Some of its texts even were used in the Chinese edition of Zhonghua dazangjing which was based on the Jin edition which in turn was a sister edition sent to Korea. 

The Tripiṭaka Koreana was one of the most coveted items among Japanese Buddhists in the Edo period. Japan never managed to create a woodblock Tripiṭaka, and made constant requests and attempts to acquire the Tripiṭaka Koreana from Korea since 1388. 45 complete printings of the Tripiṭaka Koreana were gifted to Japan since the Muromachi period. The Tripiṭaka Koreana was used as the basis for the modern Japanese Taishō Tripiṭaka.

Each block was made of birch wood from the southern islands of Korea and treated to prevent the decay of the wood. The blocks were soaked in sea water for three years, then cut and then boiled in salt water. Next, the blocks were placed in the shade and exposed to the wind for three years, at which point they were ready to be carved. After each block was carved, it was covered in a poisonous lacquer to keep insects away and then framed with metal to prevent warping.

Every block was inscribed with 23 lines of text with 14 characters per line. Therefore, each block, counting both sides, contained a total of 644 characters. The consistency of the style, and some sources, suggests that a single man carved the entire collection but it is now believed that a team of 30 men carved the Tripiṭaka.

Modern edition
The modern edition has 1514 texts in 47 volumes.

See also
Early Buddhist Texts
Pali Canon
Taishō Tripiṭaka
Tripiṭaka tablets at Kuthodaw Pagoda
Gandhāran Buddhist texts
Buddhist texts
Buddhism in Korea
National treasures of South Korea

References

Cited works

External links 

Tripitaka Koreana (Site in Korean with electronic scans of the Tripiṭaka)
The Korean Tripiṭaka
National Heritage
(Haeinsa) National Treasures    32
UNESCO

 
 

National Treasures of South Korea

Tripiṭaka
Memory of the World Register
Korean
Culture in Goryeo
Buddhism in Goryeo
Dictionaries
Reference works